Voznesenka is a rural locality (a selo) in Polyakovsky Selsoviet, Uchalinsky District, Bashkortostan, Russia. The population was 410 as of 2010. There are 8 streets.

Geography 
Voznesenka is located 55 km northeast of Uchaly (the district's administrative centre) by road. Absalyamovo is the nearest rural locality.

References 

Rural localities in Uchalinsky District